The 1932 Delaware gubernatorial election was held on November 8, 1932. Incumbent Republican Governor C. Douglass Buck ran for re-election to a second term. He unanimously won renomination at the Republican state convention. In the general election, Buck faced the Democratic nominee, Landreth L. Layton, the scion of a prominent family in Delaware politics. Despite the nationwide Democratic landslide, Republicans performed well in Delaware; Herbert Hoover narrowly won Delaware over Franklin D. Roosevelt. Accordingly, Buck was able to win re-election, and significantly outpaced Hoover's slim margin; he received 54% of the vote to Layton's 45%.

General election

References

Bibliography
 Delaware House Journal, 104th General Assembly, 1st Reg. Sess. (1933).

1932
Delaware
Gubernatorial
November 1932 events in the United States